Juárez Hoy is a daily newspaper in Ciudad Juárez, Chihuahua, Mexico. Owned by Televisión de la Frontera in conjunction with Publicaciones Graficas Rafime, the newspaper began publication in 2008.

See also
 List of newspapers in Mexico

External links
Juárez Hoy

2008 establishments in Mexico
Mass media in Ciudad Juárez
Newspapers established in 2008
Newspapers published in Mexico
Spanish-language newspapers